A list of Portuguese films that were first released in 2004.

See also
2004 in Portugal

References

2004
Lists of 2004 films by country or language
2004 in Portugal